Decline of an Empire is a 2014 British biographical historical drama film, produced and directed by Michael Redwood, about the life of Catherine of Alexandria. It is one of the last film roles of Peter O'Toole, who died before the film was released, and the last film of Joss Ackland before he retired. The film originally carried the working title Katherine of Alexandria.

Cast
 Nicole Madjarov as Katherine of Alexandria
 Peter O'Toole as Cornelius Gallus
 Steven Berkoff as Liberius
 Joss Ackland as Rufus
 Jack Goddard as Constantine the Great
 Dudley Sutton as Marcellus
 Edward Fox as Constantius
 Samantha Beckinsale as Vita

Release
The film was due for release in 2014 and was released direct-to-DVD in the United States on 12 August 2014 under the title Decline of an Empire. The film was also released direct-to-DVD in the United Kingdom on 6 April 2015 as Fall of an Empire: The Story of Katherine of Alexandria.
Red Rock Entertainment acted as executive producers.

References

External links
 
 

2014 films
2014 biographical drama films
2010s historical drama films
British biographical drama films
British historical drama films
Cultural depictions of Constantine the Great
Constantine the Great and Christianity
Films about Christianity
Films set in ancient Egypt
Films set in the 4th century
Films set in the Roman Empire
4th century in the Roman Empire
2014 drama films
2010s English-language films
2010s British films